Javier Parrado (born 1964) is a Bolivian classical composer, whose works have been performed in Europe, and Latin America.

Biography

Javier Parrado received his musical education at the National School of Music and the National Conservatory of Music in La Paz, Bolivia under the guidance of Cergio Prudencio , and Alberto Villalpando . After graduation he studied in seminars with Franco Donatoni, Edgar Alandia , Reinhard Febel, Coriún Aharonián, Victor Rasgado and Graciela Paraskevaidis.

Several of his compositions were performed in America and Europe. In Bolivia, he worked for many years as arranger of folkloric music and resident composer of the National Symphony Orchestra, as well as a teacher, composer, arranger and researcher with various compositions and texts published.

TreMedia publishes his music for guitar. Several of his articles about Bolivian music have been also published.

He is part of the project “Uyaricuna, ist'asiñani, nos escucharemos” in association with Artekorp with the objective to diffuse the diverse musical expressions originated in the Bolivian territory and Andean land to project them into the symphonic and chamber music .

Awards and honors

Received first prizes of the Adrián Patiño composition competition (La Paz, Bolivia, 1993 and 2009), and the guitar composition contest Agustín Barrios Mangoré (Salzburg, Austria, 2001). Best Soundtrack in the Amalia de Gallardo Video Contest (La Paz, Bolivia, 2004). A special mention to his choral work "Tanta Luz que dexan" (Islas Canarias, Spain, 2004), and the 2009 Medal for Artistic Merit of Asociación Boliviana Pro Arte (La Paz, Bolivia, July 2009)

Selected works

Solo Instrument
Estaciones para flauta (1993) for Flute
Sendas Lunares (1997) for Guitar. Christoph Jäagin, guitar and editor 
Sombra y Agua (1997–98) for Piano. Marco Ciccone, piano  
Ellas ¿y Bach? (2004) for Violin

Electroacoustic music
Inti Yana (1994) for Tape

Chamber Ensemble
Presencia alterna (1991) Text von Eduardo Mitre  for Sopran and Ensemble
Llamadas (1991, rev 96) for Violin and Marimba. Javier Pinell, violin 
Salto al Alba (1996) for Guitar and Flute. Alvaro Montenegro, flauta y Gentaro Takada, Guitar  
Ciclo sobre textos de Goethe (1999) for Voice and Piano
Pirqa, brasa y ceniza (2002), for 3 Zampoñas, 3 Flutes (C, piccolo und Bass, Oboe with sord. ad lib). Premiere: Ensemble Antara . Audio
Noche Cúbica (2005) for Violin and Ensemble

Choral Music
Tanta luz que dexan (2004) for mixed Choir

Orchestra
Reposada brasa (2002) for Orchestra
Aceras líquidas y pasos lunares (2005) for Orchestra
Alegres Prestes, homenaje al Gran Poder (2009) for symphonic band. 
Selection of “Uyaricuna ist`asiñani, nos escucharemos” (2006): 
Tinkus for Orchestra 
Chiriwanos for Orchestra
A cielo abierto (2007) para Orquesta sinfónica

Selection of orchestral arrangements 
Voice and orchestra: songs of Enriqueta Ulloa, Emma Junaro, Los Kjarkas, Yalo Cuellar, Esther Marisol, etc.
Charango and orquesta: "El Nacimiento del Charango" of William Centellas
Quena and orquesta: "Sapitay Baguala", and "Yurita" of Juan Lazzaro Méndolas
Bolivian folkloric music: Novia Santa Cruz, Soledad(Implorando), Llamerada, Diabladas, Destacamento 111b.

Publications and references

Tinkus for orchestra in YouTube: 
New arrangements: 
PARRADO, Javier 2006 “Los aires nacionales en el siglo XIX. Apuntes sobre la notación musical”. En: Fundación del Banco Central de Bolivia, Revista Cultural. Año X – Nº 43 / Noviembre – diciembre 2006
ALANDIA, Mariana y PARRADO, Javier. 2004 “El Fondo Bolivia, una mirada a nuestra historia musical bajo la óptica del repertorio de piano”. En Temas en la crisis. Las culturas de Bolivia. Número 65-IV-2004
ALANDIA, Mariana y PARRADO, Javier. 2003 “A la vera del piano”. En: T’inkazos, Revista Boliviana de Ciencias Sociales cuatrimestral del Programa de Investigación Estratégica de Bolivia (PIEB). Número 14 Junio 2003
PARRADO, Javier 2002 “Laberinto y código sonoros”. En Ciencia y Cultura Revista de la Universidad Católica Boliviana San Pablo. Número 11 diciembre Año 2002.
SEOANE, Carlos; EICHMANN, Andrés; PARRADO, Javier; SOLIZ, Carmen; ALARCÓN, Estela y SÁNCHEZ, Sergio. 2000 Melos Damus Vocibus, Códices Cantorales Platenses. Proinsa. La Paz
 http://www.tremediamusicedition.com/komponisten/parrado.htm
 Festival Aspekte: https://web.archive.org/web/20110531200448/http://www.aspekte-salzburg.at/Biographien/100.html
 Unesco: http://portal.unesco.org/culture/en/ev.php-URL_ID=16129&URL_DO=DO_TOPIC&URL_SECTION=201.html
 Conservatoire national supérieur de musique et de danse de Paris (Library): Pirqa, brasa y ceniza http://www.musiquecontemporaine.fr/record/oai:cnsmdp-aloes:0749578
 FUNDACIÓN CULTURAL “LA PLATA” 2005, Historia de la Cultura Boliviana en el Siglo XX. “I La Música”. Agua del Inisterio”. Sucre, Bolivia.

Living people
20th-century classical composers
21st-century classical composers
Bolivian composers
Bolivian male musicians
1964 births
Male classical composers
20th-century male musicians
21st-century male musicians